Inverclyde South West is one of the seven wards used to elect members of the Inverclyde Council. It elects three Councillors.

The ward includes the neighbouring coastal villages of Inverkip and Wemyss Bay on the Firth of Clyde, an elevated rural hinterland to the east (part of the Clyde Muirshiel Regional Park, including Loch Thom) and the south-western suburbs of Greenock (the Braeside, Branchton and Larkfield neighbourhoods). In 2019, the ward had a population of 11,649.

Councillors

Election Results

2022 Election
2022 Inverclyde Council election

2017 Election
2017 Inverclyde Council election

2012 Election
2012 Inverclyde Council election

2007 Election
2007 Inverclyde Council election

References

Wards of Inverclyde
Firth of Clyde